This is a list of programs that are currently airing, or have aired in the past, on Fuse.

Current programming
These programs are seen regularly, or infrequently, as of February 2023.

Current original series

Made From Scratch (2018)
Sex Sells (2019)
Upcycle Nation
We Need to Talk About America (2019)

Reruns of ended series

Curvy Girls
Hip-Hop Houdini
Hype Up
Kickasso
Like, Share, Dimelo
Model Latina
Shine True (2021)
Struggle Gourmet
Sugar and Toys
That White People Shit
T-Pain's School of Business
True Dating Stories (2021)
Unbreakable

Acquired
Buffy the Vampire Slayer
Malcolm in the Middle
My Wife and Kids
TallBoyz

Former programming
These programs are no longer airing on the channel.

Original/first-run series

Big Boy’s Neighborhood
Big Freedia: Queen of Bounce
Billy on the Street
Complex X Fuse
Crusty's Dirt Demons (2004–07)
Daily Download (2004–06)
The Daily Noise
Ex-Wives of Rock (2012-14)
Hoppus on Music
The Hustle
The Hustle After Party
IMX (Interactive Music Exchange) (2003–04)
Insane Clown Posse Theater
Kung Faux (2003–05)
Ming’s Dynasty
Metal Asylum (2005–06)
Munchies (2005–06)
No. 1 Countdown
NOFX: Backstage Passport (2008)
Pants Off Dance Off (2005–07)
Pitbull: Beyond Worldwide
Rad Girls (2007–08)
The Read with Kid Fury and Crissle West 
Rock and Roll Acid Test (2008–09)
Rock and Roll Hall of Fame Induction Ceremony
The Sauce (2007–08)
Sessions@AOL (2003–04)
SKEE TV
Slave to the Metal (2005–07)
Steven's Untitled Rock Show (2004–09)
Talking Metal On Fuse (2007–09)
Transcendent
Uranium (2003–05)
Victory TV
Video on Trial
Warped Roadies
White Guy Talk Show
The Whitest Kids U' Know (2008; moved to IFC)

Acquired/syndicated programming

Beef
Cock'd Gunns
Electric Circus (2003–04)
Empire Square (2005–06)
Ergo Proxy (2006–07)
Everybody Hates Chris 
The L.A. Complex
LFL Football Night
Malcolm & Eddie
Miami Ink
Ming's Dynasty (2021)
The Mindy Project
Moesha
The Parkers
The PJs
Sabrina the Teenage Witch
Scrubs
Sister, Sister
Tenjho Tenge (2007–08)
V.I.P.
WTF Baron Davis
Xbox E3 Briefing (2017-2019)

Notes

References

Fuse